Polycera janjukia is a species of sea slug, a nudibranch, a shell-less marine gastropod mollusc in the family Polyceridae.

Distribution 
This species was described from Victoria, Australia. It also occurs in New South Wales and Tasmania.

References

Polyceridae
Gastropods described in 1962